The 2022 African Nations Championship qualification was a men's football competition which decided the participating teams of the 2022 African Nations Championship. Only national team players who were playing in their country's own domestic league were eligible to compete in the tournament.

A total of 18 teams qualified to play in the final tournament, including Algeria which qualified automatically as hosts.

Teams
A total of 42 (out of 54) CAF member national teams entered the qualifying rounds, split into zones according to their regional affiliations. The draw for the qualifying rounds was held on 26 May 2022 at the CAF headquarters in Cairo, Egypt.

Notes
Teams in bold qualified for the final tournament.
Teams in italics received a bye to the second round in the qualifying draw.
(W): Withdrew after draw

Format
Qualification ties were played on a home-and-away two-legged basis. If the aggregate score was tied after the second leg, the away goals rule would be applied, and if still level, the penalty shoot-out would be used to determine the winner (no extra time would be played).

Schedule
The schedule of the qualifying rounds was as follows.

Northern Zone
Algeria qualified as host nation.

After Egypt and Tunisia withdrew before the draw, Libya and Morocco were the only teams entered: therefore, the Zone was scratched and both teams qualified.

Western Zone A

First round

|}

Senegal won 4–2 on aggregate.

Sierra Leone won 3–2 on aggregate.

1–1 on aggregate. Guinea-Bissau won 5–3 on penalties.

Second round
Winners qualified for 2022 African Nations Championship.

|}

Western Zone B

First round

|}

Ghana won 4–0 on aggregate.

Second round
Winners qualified for 2022 African Nations Championship.

|}

Central Zone

Winners qualified for 2022 African Nations Championship.

|}

Central Eastern Zone

First round

|}

Ethiopia won 5–0 on aggregate.

Tanzania won 3–1 on aggregate.

3–3 on aggregate. Djibouti won 4–2 on penalties.

Second round
Winners qualified for 2022 African Nations Championship.

|}

Southern Zone

First round

|}

Angola won 3–0 on aggregate.

South Africa won 1–0 on aggregate.

2–2 on aggregate. Botswana won on away goals rule.

 
Madagascar won 4–0 on aggregate.

Malawi advanced on walkover.

Mozambique won 1–0 on aggregate.

Second round
Winners qualified for 2022 African Nations Championship.

|}

Qualified teams
The following 18 teams qualified for the final tournament.

Goalscorers
There were 105 goals scored in 54 matches, for an average of 1.94 goals per match.

References

External links
— qualifiers schedule
Total African Nations Championship, CAFonline.com
Qualifiers – Central-Eastern Zone
Qualifiers – Central Zone
Qualifiers – North Zone
Qualifiers – Southern Zone
Qualifiers – West Zone A
Qualifiers – West Zone B

2022
Qualification
2022 in African football
May 2022 sports events in Africa
July 2022 sports events in Africa
August 2022 sports events in Africa
September 2022 sports events in Africa